Lioglyphostoma oenoa is a species of sea snail, a marine gastropod mollusk in the family Pseudomelatomidae, the turrids and allies.

Description
The length of the shell attains 10 mm.

Distribution
This marine species occurs off Florida, USA; Puerto Rico; Colombia

References

 Bartsch, Paul. "New mollusks of the family Turritidae (with eight plates)" (1934)

External links
 Rosenberg G., Moretzsohn F. & García E. F. (2009). Gastropoda (Mollusca) of the Gulf of Mexico, Pp. 579–699 in Felder, D.L. and D.K. Camp (eds.), Gulf of Mexico–Origins, Waters, and Biota. Biodiversity. Texas A&M Press, College Station, Texas
 
 Gastropods.com: Lioglyphostoma oenoa

oenoa
Gastropods described in 1934